The name Helene or  Helena has been used for nine tropical cyclones worldwide: seven in the Atlantic Ocean, one in the South-West Indian Ocean, and one in the Western Pacific Ocean.

In the Atlantic:
 Hurricane Helene (1958) – a powerful storm that grazed Cape Hatteras causing $11 million in damage.
 Tropical Storm Helena (1963) – between Dominica and Guadeloupe and struck Antigua.
 Hurricane Helene (1988) – a Category 4 hurricane that stayed in the open sea, never threatening land.
 Tropical Storm Helene (2000) – entered the Caribbean Sea, made landfall at Fort Walton Beach, Florida, exited at the North Carolina coast and regained tropical storm strength heading northeast.
 Hurricane Helene (2006) – a Category 3 hurricane that stayed in the open ocean, never threatening land.
 Tropical Storm Helene (2012) – a tropical storm that affected Trinidad and Tobago and Mexico.
 Hurricane Helene (2018) – a Category 2 hurricane that formed between Cape Verde and West Africa.

In the South-West Indian:
 Cyclone Helene (1969)

In the Western Pacific:
 Tropical Storm Helene (1950) (T5009) – stalled near Japan and struck China.

Atlantic hurricane set index articles
Pacific typhoon set index articles